"What Kind of Fool Do You Think I Am" is a song recorded by American country music artist Lee Roy Parnell, written by Al Carmichael and Gary Griffin. It was released in May 1992 as the second single from the album, Love Without Mercy. The song was Parnell's fifth single release, and his first to reach Top 40 on the Hot Country Songs charts. It is also one of three singles in his career to reach number two on the country music charts.

Chart positions
"What Kind of Fool Do You Think I Am" debuted at number 75 on the U.S. Billboard Hot Country Singles & Tracks for the week of May 16, 1992.

Year-end charts

References

Lee Roy Parnell songs
1992 singles
Song recordings produced by Scott Hendricks
Song recordings produced by Barry Beckett
Arista Nashville singles
1992 songs